Michalak (plural Michalakowie)  is a Polish surname. Notable people with the surname include:
 Andrzej Michalak (born 1959), Polish cyclist
 Aneta Michalak (born 1977), Polish canoer
 Borys Szyc (born 1978 as Borys Michalak), Polish film and theatre actor and musician
 Chris Michalak (born 1971), American baseball player
 Christophe Michalak (born 1973), French Master Pâtissier
 Dariusz Michalak (born 1966), Polish footballer 
 Eugeniusz Michalak (1908–1988), Polish cyclist
 Frédéric Michalak (born 1982), French rugby union player
 Jérémy Michalak (born 1980), French television presenter and producer
 Johannes Michalak, German clinical psychologist 
 Konrad Michalak (born 1997), Polish professional footballer 
 Krzysztof Michalak (born 1987), Polish association football player
 Lechosław Michalak (born 1956), Polish cyclist
 Marek Michalak (born 1971), Polish pedagogue and social activist
 Michael W. Michalak (born 1946), American diplomat
 Theresa Michalak (born 1992), German swimmer

 Michalak C7

See also
Michalík

Polish-language surnames